Governor Light is a small community in the Mahaica-Berbice Region of Guyana. It stands on the coastal plain, at just one metre above sea-level, along the Mahaicony River, approximately 14 kilometres upstream from its mouth. Governor Light is named after Henry Light, the 3rd Governor of British Guiana.

References

Populated places in Mahaica-Berbice